USS PCS-1386, later renamed USS Hampton (PCS-1386), was a United States Navy patrol craft sweeper - a type of patrol minesweeper - in commission from 1944 to 1956. When renamed, she became the third U.S. Navy ship to bear the name Hampton.

Construction and commissioning
PCS-1386 laid down by the Wheeler Shipbuilding Corporation at Whitestone, New York. Launched on 28 September 1944, she was commissioned on 4 November 1944.

Operational history
Equipped with the latest sonar gear, PCS-1386 was assigned to the Fleet Sound School Squadron following her shakedown period. From her arrival at Key West, Florida, on 25 November 1944, until the end of World War II in August 1945, she trained officers and enlisted men in submarine detection, preparing the students to operate the range recorder and attack plotter during antisubmarine warfare operations by destroyers and destroyer escorts.

After World War II, PCS-1386 continued training operations based at Key West. She also participated in naval exercises in the Atlantic Ocean, Caribbean Sea, and Gulf of Mexico between 1946 and 1956.

PCS-1386 was renamed USS Hampton (PCS-1386) on 15 February 1956. She was the third U.S. Navy ship to bear the name Hampton.

Decommissioning, reserve training use, and disposal

Hampton was decommissioned on 27 April 1956. She was transferred to the 5th Naval District and assigned to the Naval Reserve Training Center, Baltimore, Maryland. She operated as a training ship in a non-commissioned status until she was stricken from the Navy List on 1 July 1959 and sold.

References

NavSource Online: Patrol Craft Sweeper Photo Archive Hampton (PCS-1386) ex-PCS-1386

Patrol vessels of the United States Navy
World War II patrol vessels of the United States
Cold War patrol vessels of the United States
Minesweepers of the United States Navy
World War II minesweepers of the United States
Cold War minesweepers of the United States
Ships built in Queens, New York
1944 ships